The Popular Unity Party (PUP) is an Arab nationalist party in Tunisia.

History and profile
The party was founded in 1981 as a breakaway from the left-wing Popular Unity Movement (MUP) by members who disagreed with MUP leader Ahmed Ben Salah's policy to boycott elections. In 1983, the government of Mohammed Mzali legalised two moderate oppositional parties, including the PUP.

The party won two seats in the general election held on 20 March 1994.

Following the elections of 1999, the PUP had 7 members in the Tunisian parliament. At the 2004 legislative elections, the party won 3.6% of the popular vote and 11 out of 189 seats. The same day, its candidate , won 3.8% at the presidential elections. In 2006, the PUP tried to form an alliance with three other minor oppositional parties, the Social Liberal Party (PSL), the Unionist Democratic Union (UDU) and the Green Party for Progress (PVP). However, the alliance quickly collapsed when some of the participants were accused of pursuing particular interests rather than unity of the opposition. At the 2009 legislative elections, the PUP won 3.4% of the popular vote and 12 out of 214 seats.

After the Tunisian revolution of 2011, the PUP participated in elections for the Constituent Assembly, but failed to win any seats.

The party has published a weekly newspaper under the title of Al Wahada.

References

External links
Official website

1981 establishments in Tunisia
Arab nationalism in Tunisia
Arab socialist political parties
Formerly banned political parties in Tunisia
Formerly banned socialist parties
Political parties established in 1981
Socialist parties in Tunisia